Hassen Chaktami (born 14 December 1988) is a Tunisian heavyweight boxer. He competed at the 2016 Olympics, but was eliminated in the first bout.

References

External links

 

1988 births
Living people
Tunisian male boxers
Olympic boxers of Tunisia
Boxers at the 2016 Summer Olympics
Place of birth missing (living people)
Heavyweight boxers
21st-century Tunisian people